Archery at the 1996 Summer Olympics in Atlanta consisted of four events. The events were held in neighboring Stone Mountain.
All archery was done at a range of 70 metres.  64 archers competed in each the men's individual and women's individual competitions.  They began with a 72-arrow ranking round.  This was followed by three elimination rounds, in which archers competed head-to-head in 18-arrow matches.  After these rounds, there were 8 archers left in each gender.  The quarterfinals, semifinals, and medal matches (collectively termed the "finals round") were 12-arrow matches.  In all matches, losers were eliminated and received a final rank determined by their score in that round, with the exception of the semifinals.  The losers of the semifinals competed in the bronze medal match.

Medal summary

Men

Women

Participating nations 
Forty-one nations contributed archers to compete in the events.

Medal table

See also
Archery at the 1996 Summer Paralympics

References

External links
International Olympic Committee results database

 
1996
1996 Summer Olympics events
Olympics